Jalalpur Assembly constituency was an assembly constituency in Saran district in the Indian state of Bihar.

Overview
As a consequence of the orders of the Delimitation Commission of India, Jalalpur Assembly constituency ceased to exist in 2010.

Election results

1977-2005
In October 2005 and February 22005 Janardan Singh Sigriwal of BJP won the Jalapur assembly seat defeating his nearest rival Balagul Mobin of RJD. Janardan Singh Sigriwal, Independent, defeated Ramjan Ali of SJP(R) in 2000. Abhay Raj Kishore of CPI defeated Satya Deo Singh of BJP in 1995. Nirmala Singh of Congress defeated Abhay Raj Kishore of CPI in 1990. Sudhir Kumar Singh of Congress defeated Abhay Raj Kishore of CPI in 1985. Kumar Kalika Singh of Congress defeated Madhusudan Singh of BJP in 1980. Pro.Dr. Vameshwar Singh of JP defeated Kumar Kalika Singh of Congress in 1977.

References

Former assembly constituencies of Bihar
Politics of Saran district